is a private university in Kiyose, Tokyo, Japan, established in 1958. Formerly the JCSW was called Japan School of Social Work and established by the GHQ (General Head Quarters), Supreme Commander for the Allied Powers and the Ministry of Health, Labour and Welfare of Japan in 1946. Therefore, the tuitions of the college are the same as other national universities, although being a private university. Government (Ministry of Health, Labour and Welfare) subsidies cover the other remaining costs, except for the tuitions paid by students.

The JCSW now provides the programs of 4-year bachelor, 1 to 2-year masters (research and professional degrees), and Ph.D. In the field of social welfare studies, the college has been regarded as the "Todai" (the top-ranking university in Japan, the University of Tokyo, "Todai" in Japanese).

References

External links
 Official website 
  Library Guide(English)

Educational institutions established in 1958
Private universities and colleges in Japan
Universities and colleges in Tokyo
1958 establishments in Japan
Schools of social work
Kiyose, Tokyo